Destination... Out! is an album by American saxophonist Jackie McLean recorded in 1963 and released on the Blue Note label. It is the second McLean album to feature Bobby Hutcherson on vibraphone and Grachan Moncur III on trombone. The rhythm section is completed by bassist Larry Ridley and drummer Roy Haynes.

Reception
The AllMusic review by Thom Jurek stated: "Of all of McLean's Blue Note dates, so many of which are classic jazz recordings, Destination Out! stands as the one that reveals the true soulfulness and complexity of his writing, arranging, and 'singing' voice."

Track listing
 "Love and Hate" (Grachan Moncur III) - 8:25
 "Esoteric" (Moncur) - 9:02
 "Kahlil the Prophet" (Jackie McLean) - 10:23
 "Riff Raff" (Moncur) - 7:07

Personnel
Jackie McLean - alto saxophone
Grachan Moncur III - trombone
Bobby Hutcherson - vibes
Larry Ridley - bass
Roy Haynes - drums

References

Blue Note Records albums
Jackie McLean albums
1964 albums
Albums recorded at Van Gelder Studio
Albums produced by Alfred Lion